Hillinger may refer to:

 Carmen Hillinger, German Paralympic wheelchair fencer
 Charles Hillinger (1926–2008), American journalist
 Claude Hillinger (born 1930), German American economist
 Raymond Peter Hillinger (1904–1971), American prelate of the Roman Catholic Church
 Sean Hillinger, a fictional FBI analyst from the seventh season of 24